John F. Dobbyn is an American mystery writer and Professor of Law at the Villanova University School of Law.

As a mystery writer, he is best known for his stories set in Boston and featuring the lawyer's Lex Devlin and Michael Knight. His Devlin and Knight short story "Trumpeter Swan," published in the February 2004 issue of Alfred Hitchcock's Mystery Magazine, was a finalist for the Shamus Award for Best Short Story from the Private Eye Writers of America. His first Devlin and Knight novel, Neon Dragon, was published by University Press of New England in 2007.

External links
 Author's Web Site
 Villanova Faculty Page
 Neon Dragon publisher's page

Living people
Villanova University faculty
American male writers
Year of birth missing (living people)